The Canada Cup was an international women's rugby union tournament staged in Canada. The tournament generally features Canada, and two or three other invited nations. So far there have been four tournaments - 1993, 1996, 2000, and 2005. In addition in 2003 and 2004 Canada hosted the Women's version of the "Churchill Cup" - a competition that was in every way identical to the Canada Cup and whose records may reasonably be included with it.

The records for the six Canada and women's Churchill Cup tournaments appear below.

Appearances
Seven nations have taken part in the six Canada and women's Churchill Cup tournaments held to date:

 - 6 appearances
 - 4 appearances (1993, 2000, 2003, 2004)
 - 1 appearance (1996)
 - 4 appearances (1996, 2000, 2004, 2005)
 - 1 appearance (2005)
 - 5 appearances (1993, 1996, 2000, 2003, 2004)
 - 1 appearance (1993)

Winners

See also
Women's international rugby - includes all women's international match results
Churchill Cup

References

 
International women's rugby union competitions hosted by Canada